Brusio railway station is a railway station in the municipality of Brusio, in the Swiss canton of Graubünden. It is located on the  Bernina line of the Rhaetian Railway. Hourly services operate on this line.

Services
The following services stop at Brusio:

References

External links
 
 

Railway stations in Switzerland opened in 1908
Railway stations in Graubünden
Rhaetian Railway stations
20th-century architecture in Switzerland